The women's marathon competition at the 2006 Asian Games in Doha, Qatar was held on 9 December 2006 at the Marathon Street Circuit in Doha Corniche.

Schedule
All times are Arabia Standard Time (UTC+03:00)

Records

Results 
Legend
DNF — Did not finish

References

External links 
Results

Athletics at the 2006 Asian Games
2006
2006 Asian Games
Asian
2006 Asian Games